Engulfment and cell motility 3, also known as ELMO3, is a human gene.

The protein encoded by this gene is similar to a C. elegans protein that functions in phagocytosis of apoptotic cells and in cell migration. Other members of this small family of engulfment and cell motility (ELMO) proteins have been shown to interact with the dedicator of cyto-kinesis 1 (DOCK1) protein to promote phagocytosis and effect cell shape changes.

References

External links